Liulintun is a township of Luancheng District of Shijiazhuang in southwestern Hebei province, China, located about  east of the county seat. , it has 23 villages under its administration.

See also
List of township-level divisions of Hebei

References

Township-level divisions of Hebei